Stolin District or Stolinski Rayon is district (raion) in the southeast of the Brest Region, Belarus. Its administrative center is in the city of Stolin. The region has a population of 89,000 people, of which 26,300 people live in urban areas.

History 
It was established on January 15, 1940.

Geography 
The Stolin raion covers 3342 km2. and borders the country of Ukraine to its south.

Demographics
At the time of the Belarus Census (2009), Stolin Raion had a population of 80,695. Of these, 97.3% were of Belarusian, 1.2% Russian and 0.9% Ukrainian ethnicity. 83.2% spoke Belarusian and 14.7% Russian as their native language.

Administrative Divisions 
The district is subdivided into 2 cities and 19 village councils, which administer a total of 97 settlements (1 urban and 96 rural). The two cities are Stolin, the administrative center of the district, and Davyd-Haradok. There is one urban-class village, Rechytsa, which is classified as a worker settlement.

Notable people 
 Helena Skirmunt, painter and sculptor
 Nadzeya Ostapchuk, athlete

References

 
Districts of Brest Region